Grand Prix motorcycle racing is the premier championship of motorcycle road racing, which has been divided into three classes since 1997: 125cc, 250cc and MotoGP. Former classes that have been discontinued include 350cc, 50cc/80cc and Sidecar. The premier class is MotoGP, which was formerly known as the 500cc class. The Grand Prix Road-Racing World Championship was established in 1949 by the sport's governing body, the Fédération Internationale de Motocyclisme (FIM), and is the oldest motorsport World Championship in existence. The motorcycles used in MotoGP are purpose-built for the sport, and are unavailable for purchase by the general public because they cannot be legally ridden on public roads. From the mid-1970s to 2002, the top class of GP racing allowed 500cc with a maximum of four cylinders, regardless of whether the engine was a two-stroke or four-stroke. Rule changes were introduced in 2002, to facilitate the phasing out of two-stroke engines.

Each season consists of 6 to 20 Grands Prix contested on closed circuits, as opposed to public roads. Points earned in these events count toward the riders' and constructors' world championships. The riders' and constructors' championship are separate championships, but are based on the same point system. The number of points awarded at the end of each race to the top 15 qualifying riders depends on their placement. Points received by each finisher, from first place to 15th place: 25, 20, 16, 13, 11, 10, 9, 8, 7, 6, 5, 4, 3, 2, 1. Historically, there have been several points systems. Results from all current Grands Prix count towards the championships; in the past, only a certain number of results were counted.

Giacomo Agostini has won the most championships, with eight, including a record seven championships in succession from 1966 to 1972. Marc Márquez is the youngest to win the championship; he was 20 years and 266 days old when he became champion in 2013. Italian riders have won the most championships; seven riders have won a total of twenty-one championships. Riders from Great Britain have won the second most; six riders have won a total of seventeen championships. Riders from the United States have won the third most, as seven riders have won a total of fifteen championships. Leslie Graham won the inaugural championship in 1949.

Champions

 The "Season" column refers to the season the competition was held, and wikilinks to the article about that season.
 The "Margin" column refers to the margin of points by which the winner defeated the runner-up.

By season

Multiple champions

 Bold indicates active rider.

By constructor

By nationality

References
Bibliography

 

General
 

Specific

500cc Motogp World Champions
Moto 500